General elections were held in the Netherlands Antilles on 27 January 2006. The result was a highly fragmented Estates, with no party winning more than five seats.

Results

References

Elections in the Netherlands Antilles
Netherlands Antilles
General election
Election and referendum articles with incomplete results